This was the first edition of the men's doubles event at Eastbourne.
Mariusz Fyrstenberg and Marcin Matkowski defeated Travis Parrott and Filip Polášek 6-4, 6-4

Seeds

Draw

Draw

External links
 Draw

Aegon International - Men's Doubles
Doubles